is a 2020 Japanese crowdfunded kaiju biopic film directed by Hiroto Yokokawa. The film was based on Daiei's unfinished 1964 Gamera precursor, Giant Horde Beast Nezura and stars Yukijirō Hotaru as a character based on the president of Daiei, Mai Saito, Mach Fumiake, and Shirō Sano.

Cast 

 Yukijirō Hotaru as Nagano
 Kazuma Yoneyama as Yukawa
 Norman England as Schmidt
 Ippei Osako as Shigeo
 Yoshiro Uchida as Takiyama
 Shirō Sano as Azuma
Noboru Sato as Muraoka
 Mai Saito as Junko
 Mach Fumiake as Monto
 Masanori Kikuzawa as Tsukaji
Himawari Ono as Sachiko
Bin Furuya as Oyaji
 Akira Ohashi as Mammoth Nezura

Production 
On December 7, 2020, Takuya Imahori and Michiaki Watanabe was announced as the film's composers.

Release

Theatrical 
Nezura 1964 was first released in Tokyo released on December 19, 2020. A month later, it was released nationwide on January 16, 2021.

Home media 
The film was released to DVD in Japan in January 2021 and will soon be released in North America by SRS Cinema.

Giant Horde Beast Nezura 
 is an unfinished 1964 kaiju film directed by Mitsuo Murayama and produced by Daiei Film. The film's production was shut down by the health department because the wild brown rats used were escaping the set and had the potential to transmit disease to the surrounding area. Despite the project's cancellation, the studio was not dissuaded from producing more kaiju films, and released Gamera, the Giant Monster the following year.

Development 
The film developers were inspired by Hitchcock’s The Birds "animal attack" concept, but decided to replace birds with giant rats.

See also 

 The Great Buddha Arrival
Gamera
Godzilla
Pulgasari

References

External links 

 Official website
 

2020 films
2020s Japanese-language films
Japanese drama films
2020 biographical drama films
Prequel films
Prequels
Giant monster films
Crowdfunded films
Kaiju films
2020s monster movies
Films about films
Films about filmmaking
Japanese prequel films